In game theory, the stag hunt, sometimes referred to as the assurance game, trust dilemma or common interest game, describes a conflict between safety and social cooperation. The stag hunt problem originated with philosopher Jean-Jacques Rousseau in his Discourse on Inequality. In the most common account of this dilemma, which is quite different from Rousseau's, two hunters must decide separately, and without the other knowing, whether to hunt a stag or a hare. However, both hunters know the only way to successfully hunt a stag is with the other's help. One hunter can catch a hare alone with less effort and less time, but it is worth far less than a stag and has much less meat. It would be much better for each hunter, acting individually, to give up total autonomy and minimal risk, which brings only the small reward of the hare. Instead, each hunter should separately choose the more ambitious and far more rewarding goal of getting the stag, thereby giving up some autonomy in exchange for the other hunter's cooperation and added might. This situation is often seen as a useful analogy for many kinds of social cooperation, such as international agreements on climate change.

The stag hunt differs from the prisoner's dilemma in that there are two pure-strategy Nash equilibria: one where both players cooperate, and one where both players defect. In the Prisoner's Dilemma, in contrast, despite the fact that both players cooperating is Pareto efficient, the only pure Nash equilibrium is when both players choose to defect.

An example of the payoff matrix for the stag hunt is pictured in Figure 2.

Formal definition
Formally, a stag hunt is a game with two pure strategy Nash equilibria—one that is risk dominant and another that is payoff dominant. The payoff matrix in Figure 1 illustrates a generic stag hunt, where . Often, games with a similar structure but without a risk dominant Nash equilibrium are called assurance games. For instance if a=10, b=5, c=0, and d=2. While (Hare, Hare) remains a Nash equilibrium, it is no longer risk dominant. Nonetheless many would call this game a stag hunt.

In addition to the pure strategy Nash equilibria there is one mixed strategy Nash equilibrium. This equilibrium depends on the payoffs, but the risk dominance condition places a bound on the mixed strategy Nash equilibrium. No payoffs (that satisfy the above conditions including risk dominance) can generate a mixed strategy equilibrium where Stag is played with a probability higher than one half. The best response correspondences are pictured here.

The stag hunt and social cooperation

Although most authors focus on the prisoner's dilemma as the game that best represents the problem of social cooperation, some authors believe that the stag hunt represents an equally (or more) interesting context in which to study cooperation and its problems (for an overview see ).

There is a substantial relationship between the stag hunt and the prisoner's dilemma. In biology many circumstances that have been described as prisoner's dilemma might also be interpreted as a stag hunt, depending on how fitness is calculated.

It is also the case that some human interactions that seem like prisoner's dilemmas may in fact be stag hunts. For example, suppose we have a prisoner's dilemma as pictured in Figure 3. The payoff matrix would need adjusting if players who defect against cooperators might be punished for their defection. For instance, if the expected punishment is −2, then the imposition of this punishment turns the above prisoner's dilemma into the stag hunt given at the introduction.

Examples of the stag hunt
The original stag hunt dilemma is as follows: a group of hunters have tracked a large stag, and found it to follow a certain path. If all the hunters work together, they can kill the stag and all eat. If they are discovered, or do not cooperate, the stag will flee, and all will go hungry.

The hunters hide and wait along a path. An hour goes by, with no sign of the stag. Two, three, four hours pass, with no trace. A day passes. The stag may not pass every day, but the hunters are reasonably certain that it will come. However, a hare is seen by all hunters moving along the path.

If a hunter leaps out and kills the hare, he will eat, but the trap laid for the stag will be wasted and the other hunters will starve. There is no certainty that the stag will arrive; the hare is present. The dilemma is that if one hunter waits, he risks one of his fellows killing the hare for himself, sacrificing everyone else. This makes the risk twofold; the risk that the stag does not appear, and the risk that another hunter takes the kill.

In addition to the example suggested by Rousseau, David Hume provides a series of examples that are stag hunts. One example addresses two individuals who must row a boat. If both choose to row they can successfully move the boat. However, if one doesn't, the other wastes his effort. Hume's second example involves two neighbors wishing to drain a meadow. If they both work to drain it they will be successful, but if either fails to do his part the meadow will not be drained.

Several animal behaviors have been described as stag hunts. One is the coordination of slime molds. In times of stress, individual unicellular protists will aggregate to form one large body. Here if they all act together they can successfully reproduce, but success depends on the cooperation of many individual protozoa. Another example is the hunting practices of orcas (known as carousel feeding). Orcas cooperatively corral large schools of fish to the surface and stun them by hitting them with their tails. Since this requires that the fish have no way to escape, it requires the cooperation of many orcas.

Author James Cambias describes a solution to the game as the basis for an extraterrestrial civilization in his 2014 science fiction book A Darkling Sea. Carol M. Rose argues that the stag hunt theory is useful in 'law and humanities' theory. In international law, countries are the participants in a stag hunt. They can, for example, work together to improve good corporate governance.

A stag Hunt with pre-play communication

Aumann proposed: "Let us now change the scenario by permitting pre-play communication. On the face of it, it seems that the players can then 'agree' to play (c,c); though the agreement is not enforceable, it removes each player's doubt about the other one playing c". Aumann concluded that in this game "agreement has no effect, one way or the other." It is his argument: "The information that such an agreement conveys is not that the players will keep it (since it is not binding), but that each wants the other to keep it." In this game "each player always prefers the other to play c, no matter what he himself plays. Therefore, an agreement to play (c,c) conveys no information about what the players will do, and cannot be considered self-enforcing." Weiss and Agassi wrote about this argument: "This we deem somewhat incorrect since it is an oversight of the agreement that may change the mutual expectations of players that the result of the game depends on... Aumann’s assertion that there is no a priori reason to expect agreement to lead to cooperation requires completion; at times, but only at times, there is a posteriori reason for that...  How a given player will behave in a given game, thus, depends on the culture within which the game takes place".

See also
 Common knowledge (logic)
  Discourse on Inequality
 Mutual knowledge
 Pluralistic ignorance
 Prisoner's dilemma
 Social contract

References
Notes

Bibliography

External links
 The stag hunt at GameTheory.net
 

Non-cooperative games
Evolutionary game theory
Social science experiments